The following is a list of stations found within the Chengdu Metro.

Line 1

Line 2

Line 3

Line 4

Line 5

Line 6

Line 7

Line 8

Line 9

Line 10

Line 17

Line 18

Notes

References

Chengdu Metro
Chengdu
Chengdu